Corwin Brown (born April 25, 1970) is an American football coach who was most recently the defensive backs coach for the New England Patriots of the National Football League. Following an eight-year career in the NFL as a safety from 1993–2000, Brown worked as an assistant coach for Virginia, the New York Jets, and Notre Dame before joining the Patriots.

College career
After graduating from Julian High School in Chicago, Brown attended the University of Michigan, where he played football as a defensive back. He was a two-year starter, co-captain of the 1992 team, and All-Big 10 in 1992.

Professional career

New England Patriots
Brown was drafted in the fourth round (110th overall) in the 1993 NFL Draft by the New England Patriots. He started a career-high 12 games at safety as a rookie, recording 56 tackles, also a career-high. He went on to play three more seasons for the Patriots and head coach Bill Parcells (and in 1996, secondary coach Bill Belichick), starting only two games over that span and picking up 38 tackles.

New York Jets
Brown followed Parcells and Belichick to the New York Jets in 1997, starting one game over two seasons and recording 29 tackles and one interception.

Detroit Lions
The final two years of Brown's career were spent with the Detroit Lions. After starting one game in 1999, Brown started four games in 2000, recording a half sack, two interceptions, and 21 tackles. He retired following the season at age 30.

Coaching career

Virginia
Brown worked as a special teams coach under former Patriots and Jets assistant coach Al Groh at the University of Virginia from 2001 through 2003.

New York Jets
Brown joined the Jets as a defensive backs coach in 2004 under head coach Herman Edwards and spent three years with the team, including one under then-new head coach and former Patriots assistant Eric Mangini in 2006.

Notre Dame
On January 19, 2007, Brown was named the defensive coordinator and outside linebackers coach for the University of Notre Dame Fighting Irish under head coach and former Patriots assistant Charlie Weis. In 2008, Brown shifted his positional responsibilities to defensive backs. He was named Associate Head Coach in 2009 while serving as co-defensive coordinator and defensive backs coach. Weis was fired by Notre Dame after the season and Brown did not return to the team.

New England Patriots
Following his tenure at Notre Dame, Bill Belichick hired Brown as a defensive backs coach in January 2010 to help incumbent defensive backs coach Josh Boyer with safeties. Brown was not retained after one season.

Personal life
On August 12, 2011, a SWAT team descended on Brown's home in the South Bend, Indiana suburb of Granger. Authorities heard shots fired inside the house. The original 911 call involved a domestic disturbance issue.  He was hospitalized with a self-inflicted gunshot wound. He was sentenced to four years probation.

References

External links
New England Patriots bio

1970 births
Living people
Sportspeople from Chicago
Players of American football from Chicago
Michigan Wolverines football players
American football safeties
New England Patriots players
New York Jets players
Detroit Lions players
Virginia Cavaliers football coaches
New York Jets coaches
Notre Dame Fighting Irish football coaches
New England Patriots coaches